Martin Kavanagh (born 1994) is an Irish hurler who currently plays as a right corner-forward for the Carlow senior team.

Born in Bahana, County Carlow, Kavanagh first played competitive hurling during his schooling at Borris Vocational School. He arrived on the inter-county scene when he first linked up with the Carlow minor team before later joining the under-21 side. He made his senior debut during the 2012 championship.

At club level Kavanagh is a four time Carlow Senior Hurling Championship medallist with Saint Mullin's gaa.

Career statistics

Honours

Team
Institute of Technology, Carlow
Higher Education League (3): 2014, 2015, 2016

St Mullin's
Carlow Senior Hurling Championship(4): 2014, 2015, 2016,  2019 (c)

Carlow
Christy Ring Cup (1): 2017 (c)
National Hurling League Division 2A (2): 2012, 2018

Individual
Awards
Carlow Hurler of the Year (3): 2014, 2015, 2019

References

1994 births
Living people
Carlow inter-county hurlers
St Mullin's hurlers